Beckenham Crematorium and Cemetery is a cemetery in the London Borough of Bromley, opened in 1876.

Location and history
Beckenham Crematorium and Cemetery is located between South Norwood Country Park and Birkbeck. The cemetery was opened in 1876 although it is often erroneously reported as 1880 and was initially known as the Crystal Palace District Cemetery. It is often referred to today as the Elmers End Cemetery due to its location within Beckenham and proximity to Elmers End station. During the Second World War the larger of the cemetery’s two chapels was devastated during air raids and had to be demolished. The chapel that survived the bombing was converted to include cremation facilities and opened in 1956.

It is served by Birkbeck station, as well as Elmers End station for National Rail and London Tramlink and by Harrington Road tram stop for Tramlink.

Burials

Memorials

 130 World War I graves, including a number of casualties from the Royal Naval Depot at Crystal Palace Park and the Army Services Corp Motor Transport Depot at Grove Park .  The graves of 30 which could not be individually marked are listed on a Screen War Memorial, while those of 40 who could be satisfactorily maintained were later commemorated by 30 headstones placed in the cemetery's Second World War war graves plot.
 127 World War II graves, 12 of which are in a purpose made War Grave plot which also contains special memorials to 3 personnel of the same war whose graves could not be satisfactorily maintained.
 There is a memorial to 21 members of the Beckenham Auxiliary Fire Service who were killed in the course of a single night (19–20 April 1941) during a German raid on the East End of London in World War II. Many of the firemen were buried in the cemetery, some others in nearby West Wickham.

Notable Burials
 W.G. Grace (1848–1915), cricket player
 Frank Bourne (1855–1945), British soldier
 Thomas Crapper (1836–1910), businessman
 George Evans VC (1876–1937), World War I Victoria Cross recipient
 Josiah Stamp, 1st Baron Stamp (1880–1941), his wife, and son the 2nd Baron (who died together in an air raid on 16 April 1941).
 William Walker (1869–1918), diver
 Frederick Wolseley (1837–1899), inventor
 Robert Pate (1819–1895), British Army officer
 Doris Castlerosse (1900–1942), socialite
 Samuel Rowbotham (known as Parallax) (1816–1884), inventor

References

External links 

 Beckenham Crematorium and Cemetery on the Bromley website
 Beckenham Cemetery on the WW1 cemeteries website

Cemeteries in London
1876 establishments in England
Parks and open spaces in the London Borough of Bromley
Religion in the London Borough of Bromley
Crematoria in London
Commonwealth War Graves Commission cemeteries in England